Zangeneh or Zanganeh may refer to various places in Iran:
 Zangeneh, Fasa, Fars Province
 Zanganeh, Lamerd, Fars Province
 Zanganeh, Shiraz, Fars Province
 Zangeneh, Hamadan, a city
 Zangeneh-ye Sofla, a village in Hamadan Province
 Zanganeh, Kermanshah
 Zangeneh, Eslamabad-e Gharb, Kermanshah Province
 Zanganeh, North Khorasan, a village in Maneh and Samalqan County, North Khorasan Province, Iran
 Zanganeh, West Azerbaijan

See also
Zangeneh (surname)